On 1 April 2017, Abdul Waheed, the custodian of Pir Mohammad Ali Gujjar shrine, along with his associates tortured 20 people to death inside the shrine in Sargodha, Pakistan. Waheed was arrested by police and later admitted to committing the crime.

Attack 
The caretaker of the shrine, Abdul Waheed invited people to visit the shrine and sedated them through food on late Saturday night. Some sources also claimed that the food was poisoned. After sedation, Waheed started beating people along with his associates and tortured people with a club, a knife and other weapons. The assault was carried out in the courtyard of the shrine. Some bodies of victims were nude. During the assault, 20 people were killed, among whom were six belonging to a single family, while three were injured. Out of the three injured, one informed police.

Investigation 
After being informed, the local police arrived and arrested Waheed and four of his accomplices. During investigation, Waheed admitted to had have committed the crime. Local rescue official Mazhar Shah said that Waheed used to meet his devotees twice a month and used to torture them.

References 

2017 murders in Pakistan
21st-century mass murder in Pakistan
April 2017 crimes in Asia
Massacres in 2017
Massacres in Pakistan
Sargodha
Mass murder in 2017
Shrines in Pakistan
Terrorist incidents in Pakistan in 2017